Mount Ganos, today known as Işıklar Dağı in Turkish, is a mountain in eastern Thrace, on the European side of modern-day Turkey. It rises up from the western shore of the Sea of Marmara.

The mountain was home to Christian monks and ascetics during the Byzantine period. Byzantine Christian monks and clergymen who lived on the mountain included Patriarch Athanasius I of Constantinople and Maximos of Kafsokalyvia.

References

Byzantine Anatolia
Eastern Orthodox monasteries in Asia
Geography of the Byzantine Empire
Ganos
Landforms of Tekirdağ Province
Ganos
Geography of Thrace